The New Revolution (formerly known as Revolution, Great American Revolution and La Revolución) is a steel roller coaster located at Six Flags Magic Mountain in Valencia, California. Manufactured by Anton Schwarzkopf and designed by Werner Stengel, the roller coaster opened to the public on May 8, 1976. The New Revolution is the world's first modern roller coaster to feature a vertical loop and has been recognized for that accomplishment by American Coaster Enthusiasts (ACE), who awarded the roller coaster its Coaster Landmark status.  However, there were earlier examples of roller coasters with a full vertical loop, such as the steel roller coaster called "Looping the Loop" in Parque Japonés in Buenos Aires, which operated from 1911 to 1930.

The coaster was named after the American Revolution in celebration of the country's Bicentennial. Unlike many of the previous looping roller coasters in the 19th and early-20th centuries which attempted circular loops, Revolution's success was dependent on a clothoid-shaped vertical loop – a first in the industry.

In 2016, the coaster received a makeover for its 40th anniversary that included new trains with lap bars and an optional virtual reality experience for riders. The New Revolution soft-launched to season pass holders on March 26, 2016, and opened to the general public on April 21, 2016.

History

Great American Revolution

In the mid-1970s, Magic Mountain enlisted ride manufacturer Anton Schwarzkopf and legendary designer Werner Stengel to design and build the first looping roller coaster in modern times. The last known existence of one was Loop the Loop at Coney Island during the early 1900s. Prior to Great American Revolution's opening, a week of testing was needed to properly calibrate the tightness of the wheels, in order to get the train to complete one full circuit. At the ride's opening, staff operating the ride were outfitted with Continental Army-style uniforms to match the time period of the American Revolution, which the country was celebrating for its Bicentennial.

La Revolución, Revolution
In 1979 following the purchase of the park by Six Flags, the ride's name was changed to La Revolución in honor of the Mexican Revolution. In 1988, the ride's name was changed once more to simply Revolution. In 1992, over-the-shoulder restraints were added to the trains, alongside the existing lapbars, to prevent guests from standing up. The addition was heavily criticized, as it led to a rough ride and numerous complaints of discomfort and headbanging. 

In June 2002, a Coaster Landmark plaque awarded by American Coaster Enthusiasts (ACE) was placed near the line queue in front of the ride. The award was presented in recognition of its accomplishment as the world's first modern vertical-looping roller coaster. In 2005, parts of Revolution had to be dismantled to make way for the park's new Tatsu roller coaster that was being constructed. Revolution reopened with Tatsu on the new coaster's media day on May 11, 2006.

The New Revolution
Revolution was refurbished for the 2016 season in celebration of the roller coaster's 40th anniversary. The ride received new red and white trains, with each train's lead car featuring a silver eagle ornament mounted on the front, and the track was painted white and blue. The new trains were also fitted with lap and calf bar restraints, replacing the unpopular over-the-shoulder design, which Six Flags claimed would provide additional airtime and a more comfortable ride experience. The ride reopened as The New Revolution.

The New Revolution was among several rides at various parks that received an on-ride virtual reality (VR) feature. Riders were given the option to wear Samsung Gear VR headsets, powered by Oculus, to experience a 3D virtual world themed to a fighter jet, where riders flew through a futuristic city as co-pilots battling alien invaders. The feature debuted with the coaster when it emerged from refurbishment and reopened to season pass holders on March 26, 2016. It reopened to the general public on April 21, 2016.

On February 8, 2017, Six Flags announced that The New Revolution would offer a new VR experience known as The New Revolution Galactic Attack. It was billed as the world's first mixed Virtual Reality Experience powered by Oculus VR. The experience was centered around an alien invasion in space. As riders crest the lift hill, the setting changed into an intergalactic battle seen from the cockpit of a fighter spaceship. It became available to the public on February 25.

Beginning on November 18, 2017, Six Flags debuted a new VR experience to match the "Holiday in the Park" theme. Dubbed "Santa's Wild Sleigh Ride," it placed riders in Santa's sleigh as he delivered presents to a snowy town.

The VR option was extremely popular, causing 2-3 hour lines. The headsets would overheat and make the lines even longer. Therefore, the headsets were moved to Lex Luthor: Drop of Doom in 2018. With the VR feature removed, the ride now operates in "Classic Revolution" mode.

In November 2018, The New Revolution was renamed Red Sox Revolution temporarily after the park lost a World Series bet to Six Flags New England.

Incidents

On May 31, 1996, a park employee was hit and killed instantly while attempting to cross the tracks in the boarding station as a train was returning. The investigation determined she slipped and fell into a  pit below, crossing from the side where passengers exit over to the opposite side.

On June 12, 2015, a 10-year-old girl riding the roller coaster was found breathing but unconscious after returning to the station. She was rushed to a nearby hospital and died the following day. According to the local coroner's office, she died of natural causes unrelated to the ride. An autopsy wasn't performed to determine the exact cause, at the request of the girl's family.

References

External links
Revolution at the official Six Flags Magic Mountain website
Revolution at the Roller Coaster Database (rcdb.com)
Photos and technical data of the Revolution at the Schwarzkopf Coaster Net

Roller coasters in California
Roller coasters introduced in 1976
Roller coasters operated by Six Flags
Six Flags Magic Mountain